James Davidson Williams (December 23, 1928 – June 11, 1989) was an American football coach. He served as the head coach of the Claremont-Mudd Stags football program, representing Claremont McKenna College and Harvey Mudd College, from 1961 to 1964 and two stints as the head football coach at California State University, Los Angeles, from 1966 to 1968 and 1974 to 1975, compiling a career college football coaching record of 33–49–2.

Williams was born on December 23, 1928 in McLaughlin, South Dakota. He grew in up in Los Angeles, where attended and played football at Los Angeles High School, Los Angeles City College, and California State University, Los Angeles when it was known as Los Angeles State College. At Los Angeles City College he played as a quarterback in a T formation offense. At Los Angeles State he moved to fullback in a single-wing attack.

Williams died in Los Angeles County, California, on June 11, 1989.

Head coaching record

College

References

External links
 

1928 births
1989 deaths
American football fullbacks
American football quarterbacks
Cal State Los Angeles Diablos football coaches
Cal State Los Angeles Diablos football players
Claremont-Mudd-Scripps Stags football coaches
Los Angeles City Cubs football players
Los Angeles City Cubs football coaches
High school football coaches in California
People from Corson County, South Dakota
Players of American football from Los Angeles
Sports coaches from Los Angeles